The Temple of Juno Regina (Latin: templum or aedes Iuno Regina) was a temple in ancient Rome dedicated to "Queen Juno". It was near the Circus Flaminius in the southern half of the Campus Martius. It was vowed by consul Marcus Aemilius Lepidus in 187 BC during his final battle against the Liguri and dedicated on 23 December 179 BC, whilst he was censor. It was linked by a portico to a temple of Fortuna, possibly the temple of Fortuna Equestris. It was probably to the south of the Portico of Pompey, on the western side of the circus Flaminius.

A Temple of Jupiter Stator was later built next to it. Both temples were surrounded by the Portico of Metellus and this portico and both temples were later rebuilt and rededicated by Octavian as the Porticus Octaviae.

See also
List of Ancient Roman temples

External links
Juno Regina; penelope.uchicago.edu

Juno Regina
Temples of Juno
2nd-century BC religious buildings and structures

Destroyed temples